Grant Alexander Jerrett (born July 8, 1993) is an American professional basketball player for Utsunomiya Brex of the Japanese B.League. He played college basketball for the University of Arizona.

Early life
Jerrett was born to Lamont and Barbara Jerrett on July 8, 1993, in Costa Mesa, California. He attended Lutheran High School in La Verne, California. As a junior in 2010–11, he averaged 18.0 points, 10.1 rebounds and 3.4 blocked shots per game for coach Eric Cooper Sr. as he led Lutheran to the 2011 California Division 3 state championship game, where he posted 16 points and 10 rebounds. He was also named an all-CIF Southern Section Division 3AA performer in 2010–11.

On November 14, 2011, Jerrett signed a National Letter of Intent to play college basketball for the University of Arizona.

As a high school senior in 2011–12, Jerrett averaged 22.3 points, 10.0 rebounds and 2.4 blocked shots in leading the Trojans to a 25-8 record. He was subsequently named a 2012 Parade All-American and the Gatorade California player of the year. He also participated in the 2012 McDonald's All-American Boys Game and Jordan Brand Classic.

Considered a five-star recruit by ESPN.com, Jerrett was listed as the No. 2 power forward and the No. 9 player in the nation in 2012.

College career
In his one season at Arizona playing for coach Sean Miller, Jerrett averaged 5.2 points and 3.6 rebounds in 34 games, including two starts. He recorded season highs of 15 points against Oral Roberts and 10 rebounds against UCLA. Following the 2012–13 season, he announced his intentions to leave Arizona and either declare for the NBA draft or join another school. On April 18, 2013, he declared for the NBA draft, foregoing his final three years of college eligibility.

Professional career

Oklahoma City Thunder / Tulsa 66ers (2014–2015)
Jerrett was selected 40th overall by the Portland Trail Blazers in the 2013 NBA draft. His draft rights were later traded to the Oklahoma City Thunder for cash considerations on draft night. In July 2013, he joined the Thunder for the 2013 NBA Summer League.

On November 1, 2013, Jerrett was selected with the first overall pick in the 2013 NBA Development League Draft by the Tulsa 66ers, the Thunder's D-League affiliate team. On April 7, 2014, he signed with the Oklahoma City Thunder for the rest of the 2013–14 season.

On July 16, 2014, Jerrett re-signed with the Thunder to a multi-year deal. During his sophomore season with the Thunder, he had multiple assignments with the Oklahoma City Blue of the NBA Development League.

On November 28, 2014, Jerrett made his long-awaited NBA debut in the Thunder's 105-78 win over the New York Knicks. In just under 9 minutes of action, he recorded 3 points, 1 rebound and 1 assist.

Utah Jazz (2015)
On February 19, 2015, Jerrett was traded to the Utah Jazz in a three-team trade that also involved the Detroit Pistons. On March 10, he was assigned to the Idaho Stampede. He was recalled by the Jazz on March 19, reassigned on March 26, and recalled again on April 6. On October 15, 2015, he was waived by the Jazz.

Canton Charge (2016)
On August 16, 2016, Jerrett signed with the Portland Trail Blazers. However, he was later waived by the Trail Blazers on October 21 after appearing in four preseason games. On November 20, he was acquired by the Canton Charge and that night he made his debut in a 103–96 loss to the Westchester Knicks, recording four points and three rebounds in 19 minutes off the bench. On December 16, Jerrett early terminated his contract with Canton. In 10 games, he averaged 12.8 points, 7.2 rebounds, 2.0 assists and 1.0 block in 37.0 minutes.

China (2016–2017)
On December 16, 2016, Jerrett signed with the Beijing Ducks of the Chinese Basketball Association.

Return to Canton (2018)
On February 9, 2018, Jerrett re-signed with the Canton Charge of the NBA G League.

SeaHorses Mikawa (2018)
On August 23, 2018, Jerrett joined SeaHorses Mikawa of the Japanese B.League. On December 25, 2018, Jerrett left SeaHorses.

Igokea (2019)
On January 10, 2019, Jerrett joined Igokea for the remainder of the 2018–19 season.

ratiopharm Ulm (2019–2020)
On July 18, 2019, he has signed two-year contract with ratiopharm Ulm of the German Basketball Bundesliga (BBL). Jerrett averaged 11.4 points and six rebounds per game in the Bundesliga.

Darüşşafaka (2020–2021)
On July 18, 2020, Jerrett signed with Darüşşafaka of the Basketball Super League. He was named player of the week on November 17, after he recorded a double-double of 29 points and 10 rebounds in a victory over Galatasaray S.K.

Avtador (2020–2021)
On September 6, 2021, he signed with Avtodor of the VTB United League. He left the team after the 2022 Russian invasion of Ukraine.

NBA career statistics

Regular season

|-
| style="text-align:left;"| 
| style="text-align:left;"| Oklahoma City
| 5 || 0 || 5.0 || .176 || .077 || – || .8 || .2 || .0 || .4 || 1.4
|-
| style="text-align:left;"| 
| style="text-align:left;"| Utah
| 3 || 0 || 8.7 || .444 || .000 || 1.000 || 1.7 || .4 || .7 || .0 || 3.0
|-
| style="text-align:left;" | Career
| style="text-align:left;" |
| 8 || 0 || 6.4 || .269 || .067 || .1000 || 1.1 || .4 || .3 || .3 || 2.0

References

External links

Arizona Wildcats bio
Sports-Reference.com Profile

1993 births
Living people
ABA League players
American expatriate basketball people in Bosnia and Herzegovina
American expatriate basketball people in China
American expatriate basketball people in Germany
American expatriate basketball people in Japan
American expatriate basketball people in Turkey
American men's basketball players
Arizona Wildcats men's basketball players
Basketball players from California
Beijing Ducks players
Canton Charge players
Darüşşafaka Basketbol players
Idaho Stampede players
KK Igokea players
Oklahoma City Blue players
Oklahoma City Thunder players
Parade High School All-Americans (boys' basketball)
People from Chino Hills, California
Portland Trail Blazers draft picks
Power forwards (basketball)
Ratiopharm Ulm players
SeaHorses Mikawa players
Sportspeople from San Bernardino County, California
Tulsa 66ers players
Utah Jazz players